Qeshlaq-e Daryacheh (also Romanized as Qeshlāq-e Daryācheh; also known as Daryācheh) is a village in Cham Chamal Rural District, Bisotun District, Harsin County, Kermanshah Province, Iran. At the 2006 census, its population was 115, in 23 families.

References 

Populated places in Harsin County